Jack Doolan is an English actor. He is best known for portraying Tyler Boyce in the BBC sitcom The Green Green Grass alongside John Challis and Sue Holderness. Doolan has guest starred in other television shows such as Spooks, EastEnders, The Bill and Peep Show and a lead part in Cemetery Junction, a comedy drama film by Ricky Gervais and Stephen Merchant.

Filmography

External links
 

English male television actors
Living people
Year of birth missing (living people)
Place of birth missing (living people)